Epipremnum pinnatum is a species of flowering plant in the family Araceae. It has many common names, including centipede tongavine and dragon-tail plant. In the Philippines, it is known in Tagalog as tibatib.

Distribution 
The plant has a broad native Old World distribution. Native range extends from Northern Australia through Malaysia and Indochina into southern China, Taiwan, Japan, and as far as Melanesia. The species has also become naturalised in the West Indies..

Gallery

References

External links

pinnatum
Flora of Asia